Blackwell's Island is a 1939 American crime drama film directed by William C. McGann and written by Crane Wilbur. The film stars John Garfield, Rosemary Lane, Dick Purcell, Victor Jory, Stanley Fields and Morgan Conway. The film was released by Warner Bros. on March 25, 1939.

It was based on a real life scandal on Welfare Island.

Plot

A reporter (Garfield) covers the racketeering of a mobster (Fields) which caused the assault of a boat captain. The mobster has a police officer (Purcell) beaten and the reporting causes the mobster to go to prison for it. The reporter then assaults a DA to get thrown into the prison to report on the mobster's corruption from jail.

Cast
 John Garfield as Tim Haydon
 Rosemary Lane as Mary 'Sunny' Walsh
 Stanley Fields as 'Bull' Bransom
 Dick Purcell as Terry Walsh
 Victor Jory as Commissioner Thomas MacNair
 Morgan Conway as Steve Cardigan
 Granville Bates as Prison Warden Stuart 'Stu' Granger
 Anthony Averill as Brower
 Peggy Shannon as Pearl Murray
 Charley Foy as Benny Farmer 
 Norman Willis as Mike Garth
 Joe Cunningham as Ben Rawden
 Wade Boteler as Capt. Pedersen
 William B. Davidson as Defense Attorney Hempel
 Milburn Stone  Uncredited

References

External links
 
 
 
 

1939 films
1939 crime drama films
1930s prison films
American black-and-white films
American crime drama films
American prison drama films
Crime films based on actual events
Films about journalists
Films directed by William Clemens
Films set in New York City
Warner Bros. films
1930s English-language films
1930s American films
Films scored by Bernhard Kaun